Gian-Piero Ringel (born 1976 in Göppingen, Baden-Württemberg) is a German producer.

Gian-Piero Ringel studied film production at the  Deutsche Film- und Fernsehakademie Berlin (dffb). Together with Wim Wenders he founded Neue Road Movies Inc. in 2008.

In 2006, his first production The Measure of Things was a nominee for the Student Academy Awards. Later that year, he went on to produce Angela Schanelec's feature film Afternoon and began working as a producer for Wim Wenders's film The Palermo Shooting, which premiered at the official selection of the Festival de Cannes 2008. In 2009, he produced Angela Schanelec's feature film Orly, a co-production with the Paris-based company La Vie Est Belle, that premiered at the Berlin International Film Festival in 2010. In addition, Ringel produced Wenders's 3D dance film Pina, a co-production with Claudie Ossard and her company Eurowide Film Production, Paris. Pina premiered out of competition in the official selection of the Berlinale 2011 and has since been awarded numerous prizes, including the  German Film Award 2011 and the European Film Award 2011 for Best Documentary. The same year, Ringel was chosen as a “Producer on the Move” and co-produced the film Wolf by Bogdan Mustata. 
In 2012, Ringel was a member of the Berlinale jury for the award “Made in Germany – Perspektive Fellowship”. In addition, he has been a nominee for the BAFTA award in the category Best Film not in the English Language and the Academy Award for Best Documentary (Feature).

Ringel is managing director and partner of Neue Road Movies, a member of the European producers’ network EAVE and member of the German and European Film Academy.

Filmography (selection) 
 2004: The Measure of Things
 2007: Afternoon
 2008: The Palermo Shooting
 2010: Orly
 2011: Pina
 2012: Wolf
2015: Every Thing Will Be Fine

Honors 
 2006: 33. Student Academy Awards, Nomination 2006 for The Measure of Things
 2010: "Filmkunstpreis" 2010 for Orly at the Festival of German Films, Ludwigshafen
 2011: European Film Award for Pina as "Best Documentary (Feature)"
 2011: "Producer on the Move 2011" by German Films Service + Marketing
 2011: Deutscher Filmpreis 2011 for Pina as "Best Documentary"
 2012: 84. Academy Award Nomination for Pina as "Best Documentary (Feature)"
 2012: BAFTA - Nomination 2012 for Pina as “Best Film Not in the English Language”

References

External links 
 
 Official Website Neue Road Movies
 Official Website Pina

1976 births
Film people from Baden-Württemberg
German film producers
Living people
People from Göppingen